The Burnaby Lakers are a Senior "A" box lacrosse club based in Burnaby, British Columbia, Canada that play in the Western Lacrosse Association (WLA).

Team history

Burnaby Lakers
 1991 Richmond Outlaws (transferred to Burnaby)
 1990–present Burnaby Lakers

Affiliated teams

The Lakers also have a Jr. A team, that won the Minto Cup in 1998, 2000, 2002, 2004, & 2005.

All time record

External links
Western Lacrosse Association Website

Sport in Burnaby
Western Lacrosse Association teams
1986 establishments in British Columbia
Lacrosse clubs established in 1986